Amyas Charles Edward Morse, Baron Morse,  (born 28 June 1949) is a British politician and interim chair of the Office for Local Government. Between 2009 and 2019 he was the Comptroller and Auditor General of the National Audit Office, an independent Parliamentary body.

Born in Glasgow, Morse led the Coopers and Lybrand practice in Scotland before moving to London to manage the London City Office, subsequently becoming executive partner of Coopers and Lybrand UK. He was a global managing partner at PricewaterhouseCoopers before he was named Comptroller and Auditor General, succeeding Sir John Bourn.

Affiliations
 Member, Institute of Chartered Accountants (Scotland)

Honours
Morse was appointed Knight Commander of the Order of the Bath (KCB) in the 2014 Birthday Honours for services to parliament and public sector audit.

On 24 February 2021, it was announced that he had been recommended for a life peerage by the House of Lords Appointments Commission. He was created Baron Morse, of Aldeburgh in the County of Suffolk on 26 March 2021.

References

1949 births
Living people
Civil servants from Glasgow
Auditors
Scottish accountants
Knights Commander of the Order of the Bath
Date of birth missing (living people)
PricewaterhouseCoopers people
Coopers and Lybrand people
Crossbench life peers
People's peers
Life peers created by Elizabeth II